In mathematics, an algebraic number field (or simply number field) is an extension field  of the field of rational numbers  such that the field extension  has finite degree (and hence is an algebraic field extension).
Thus  is a field that contains  and has finite dimension when considered as a vector space over 

The study of algebraic number fields, and, more generally, of algebraic extensions of the field of rational numbers, is the central topic of algebraic number theory. This study reveals hidden structures behind usual rational numbers, by using algebraic methods.

Definition

Prerequisites

The notion of algebraic number field relies on the concept of a field. A field consists of a set of elements together with two operations, namely addition, and multiplication, and some distributivity assumptions. A prominent example of a field is the field of rational numbers, commonly denoted  together with its usual operations of addition and multiplication.

Another notion needed to define algebraic number fields is vector spaces. To the extent needed here, vector spaces can be thought of as consisting of sequences (or tuples)
(x1, x2, …)
whose entries are elements of a fixed field, such as the field  Any two such sequences can be added by adding the entries one per one. Furthermore, any sequence can be multiplied by a single element c of the fixed field. These two operations known as vector addition and scalar multiplication satisfy a number of properties that serve to define vector spaces abstractly. Vector spaces are allowed to be "infinite-dimensional", that is to say that the sequences constituting the vector spaces are of infinite length. If, however, the vector space consists of finite sequences
(x1, x2, …, xn),
the vector space is said to be of finite dimension, n.

Definition 

An algebraic number field (or simply number field) is a finite-degree field extension of the field of rational numbers. Here degree means the dimension of the field as a vector space over

Examples

 The smallest and most basic number field is the field  of rational numbers. Many properties of general number fields are modeled after the properties of  At the same time, many other properties of algebraic number fields are substantially different from the properties of rational numbers - one notable example is that the ring of algebraic integers of a number field is not a principal ideal domain, in general. 
 The Gaussian rationals, denoted  (read as " adjoined "), form the first (historically) non-trivial example of a number field. Its elements are elements of the form  where both a and b are rational numbers and i is the imaginary unit. Such expressions may be added, subtracted, and multiplied according to the usual rules of arithmetic and then simplified using the identity  Explicitly,  Non-zero Gaussian rational numbers are invertible, which can be seen from the identity  It follows that the Gaussian rationals form a number field which is two-dimensional as a vector space over 
Arithmetic operations in this field are defined in analogy with the case of Gaussian rational numbers, 

Non-Examples
 The real numbers,  and the complex numbers,  are fields which have infinite dimension as -vector spaces, hence, they are not number fields.
 The set  of ordered pairs of rational numbers, with the entry-wise addition and multiplication is a two-dimensional commutative algebra over  However, it is not a field, since it has zero divisors:

Algebraicity, and ring of integers
Generally, in abstract algebra, a field extension  is algebraic if every element  of the bigger field  is the zero of a polynomial with coefficients  in 

Every field extension of finite degree is algebraic. In particular this applies to algebraic number fields, so any element  of an algebraic number field  can be written as a zero of a polynomial with rational coefficients. Given a polynomial  such that , it can be arranged such that the leading coefficient  is one, by dividing all coefficients by it, if necessary. A polynomial with this property is known as a monic polynomial. In general it will have rational coefficients. 

If, however, its coefficients are actually all integers,  is called an algebraic integer. 

Any (usual) integer  is an algebraic integer, as it is the zero of the linear monic polynomial:
.
It can be shown that any algebraic integer that is also a rational number must actually be an integer, hence the name "algebraic integer". Again using abstract algebra, specifically the notion of a finitely generated module, it can be shown that the sum and the product of any two algebraic integers is still an algebraic integer. The field  is the field of fractions of the integral domain   This way one can get back and forth between the algebraic number field  and its ring of integers  Rings of algebraic integers have three distinctive properties: firstly,  is an integral domain that is integrally closed in its field of fractions  Secondly,  is a Noetherian ring. An abstract commutative ring with these three properties is called a Dedekind ring (or Dedekind domain), in honor of Richard Dedekind, who undertook a deep study of rings of algebraic integers.

Unique factorization
For general Dedekind rings, in particular rings of integers, there is a unique factorization of ideals into a product of prime ideals. For example, the ideal  in the ring  of quadratic integers factors into prime ideals as
 
However, unlike  as the ring of integers of  the ring of integers of a proper extension of  need not admit unique factorization of numbers into a product of prime numbers or, more precisely, prime elements. This happens already for quadratic integers, for example in  the uniqueness of the factorization fails:
 
Using the norm it can be shown that these two factorization are actually inequivalent in the sense that the factors do not just differ by a unit in  Euclidean domains are unique factorization domains; for example  the ring of Gaussian integers, and  the ring of Eisenstein integers, where  is a cube root of unity (unequal to 1), have this property.

Analytic objects: ζ-functions, L-functions, and class number formula
The failure of unique factorization is measured by the class number, commonly denoted h, the cardinality of the so-called ideal class group. This group is always finite. The ring of integers  possesses unique factorization if and only if it is a principal ring or, equivalently, if  has class number 1. Given a number field, the class number is often difficult to compute. The class number problem, going back to Gauss, is concerned with the existence of imaginary quadratic number fields (i.e.) with prescribed class number. The class number formula relates h to other fundamental invariants of  It involves the Dedekind zeta function ζ(s), a function in a complex variable s, defined by

(The product is over all prime ideals of   denotes the norm of the prime ideal or, equivalently, the (finite) number of elements in the residue field  The infinite product converges only for Re(s) > 1, in general analytic continuation and the functional equation for the zeta-function are needed to define the function for all s).
The Dedekind zeta-function generalizes the Riemann zeta-function in that ζ(s) = ζ(s).

The class number formula states that ζ(s) has a simple pole at s = 1 and at this point the residue is given by

Here r1 and r2 classically denote the number of real embeddings and pairs of complex embeddings of  respectively.

For example, Dirichlet's theorem asserts that in any arithmetic progression

Using much more advanced techniques including algebraic K-theory and Tamagawa measures, modern number theory deals with a description, if largely conjectural (see Tamagawa number conjecture), of values of more general L-functions.

Bases for number fields

Integral basis
An integral basis for a number field  of degree  is a set
B = {b1, …, bn}
of n algebraic integers in  such that every element of the ring of integers  of  can be written uniquely as a Z-linear combination of elements of B; that is, for any x in  we have
x = m1b1 + ⋯ + mnbn,
where the mi are (ordinary) integers. It is then also the case that any element of  can be written uniquely as
m1b1 + ⋯ + mnbn,
where now the mi are rational numbers.

Working locally and using tools such as the Frobenius map, it is always possible to explicitly compute such a basis, and it is now standard for computer algebra systems to have built-in programs to do this.

Power basis

An example of a number field that is not monogenic was first given by Dedekind. His example is the field obtained by adjoining a root of the polynomial

Regular representation, trace and discriminant
Recall that any field extension  has a unique -vector space structure.

by requiring

This way of associating a matrix to any element of the field  is called the regular representation. Invariants of matrices, such as the trace, determinant, and characteristic polynomial, depend solely on the field element  and not on the basis. In particular, the trace of the matrix  is called the trace of the field element  and denoted , and the determinant is called the norm of x and denoted .

Then, there is an associated matrix  which has trace  and norm  defined as the trace and determinant of the matrix .

Example 
Consider the field extension  where . Then, we have a -basis given by  since any  can be expressed as some -linear combination  Then, we can take some  where  and compute . Writing this out gives 
We can find the matrix  by writing out the associated matrix equation giving  showing 
We can then compute the trace and determinant with relative ease, giving the trace and norm.

Properties 
Here λ is a rational number, and x, y are any two elements of 

The trace form derived is a bilinear form defined by means of the trace, as
It is an integer, and is an invariant property of the field , not depending on the choice of integral basis.

The matrix associated to an element x of  can also be used to give other, equivalent descriptions of algebraic integers. Suppose that the matrix A that represents an element x has integer entries in some basis e. By the Cayley–Hamilton theorem, pA(A) = 0, and it follows that pA(x) = 0, so that x is an algebraic integer.

Example with integral basis

Consider , where x satisfies . Then an integral basis is [1, x, 1/2(x2 + 1)], and the corresponding integral trace form is

Places

Mathematicians of the nineteenth century assumed that algebraic numbers were a type of complex number. This situation changed with the discovery of p-adic numbers by Hensel in 1897; and now it is standard to consider all of the various possible embeddings of a number field  into its various topological completions  at once.

A place of a number field  is an equivalence class of absolute values on pg 9. Essentially, an absolute value is a notion to measure the size of elements  of   Two such absolute values are considered equivalent if they give rise to the same notion of smallness (or proximity). The equivalence relation between absolute values  is given by some  such thatmeaning we take the value of the norm  to the -th power.

In general, the types of places fall into three regimes. Firstly (and mostly irrelevant), the trivial absolute value | |0, which takes the value  on all non-zero  The second and third classes are Archimedean places and non-Archimedean (or ultrametric) places.

For  the following non-trivial norms occur (Ostrowski's theorem): the (usual) absolute value, sometimes denoted  which gives rise to the complete topological field of the real numbers  On the other hand, for any prime number , the p-adic absolute value is defined by
|q|p = p−n, where q = pn a/b and a and b are integers not divisible by p.

Note the general situation typically considered is taking a number field  and considering a prime ideal  for its associated ring of algebraic numbers  Then, there will be a unique place  called a non-Archimedean place. In addition, for every embedding  there will be a place called an Archimedean place, denoted  This statement is a theorem also called Ostrowski's theorem.

Examples 
The field  for  where  is a fixed 6th root of unity, provides a rich example for constructing explicit real and complex Archimedean embeddings, and non-Archimedean embeddings as wellpg 15-16.

Archimedean places

Over ,  will generally no longer be irreducible, but its irreducible (real) factors are either of degree one or two. Since there are no repeated roots, there are no repeated factors. This absolute value is called a complex place of 

Non-Archimedean or ultrametric places
To find the non-Archimedean places, let again  and  be as above. In   splits in factors of various degrees, none of which are repeated, and the degrees of which add up to  the degree of  For each of these -adically irreducible factors  we may suppose that  satisfies  and obtain an embedding of  into an algebraic extension of finite degree over  Such a local field behaves in many ways like a number field, and the -adic numbers may similarly play the role of the rationals; in particular, we can define the norm and trace in exactly the same way, now giving functions mapping to  By using this -adic norm map  for the place , we may define an absolute value corresponding to a given -adically irreducible factor  of degree  bySuch an absolute value is called an ultrametric, non-Archimedean or -adic place of 

For any ultrametric place v we have that |x|v ≤ 1 for any x in  since the minimal polynomial for x has integer factors, and hence its p-adic factorization has factors in Zp.  Consequently, the norm term (constant term) for each factor is a p-adic integer, and one of these is the integer used for defining the absolute value for v.

Prime ideals in OK
For an ultrametric place v, the subset of  defined by |x|v < 1 is an ideal  of  This relies on the ultrametricity of v: given x and y in  then
|x + y|v ≤ max (|x|v, |y|v) < 1.
Actually,  is even a prime ideal.

Conversely, given a prime ideal  of  a discrete valuation can be defined by setting  where n is the biggest integer such that  the n-fold power of the ideal. This valuation can be turned into an ultrametric place. Under this correspondence, (equivalence classes) of ultrametric places of  correspond to prime ideals of  For  this gives back Ostrowski's theorem: any prime ideal in Z (which is necessarily by a single prime number) corresponds to a non-Archimedean place and vice versa. However, for more general number fields, the situation becomes more involved, as will be explained below.

By the ultrametric property  is a ring.

Altogether, there is a three-way equivalence between ultrametric absolute values, prime ideals, and localizations on a number field.

Lying over theorem and places 

Ramification

Ramification, generally speaking, describes a geometric phenomenon that can occur with finite-to-one maps (that is, maps  such that the preimages of all points y in Y consist only of finitely many points): the cardinality of the fibers f−1(y) will generally have the same number of points, but it occurs that, in special points y, this number drops. For example, the map

has n points in each fiber over t, namely the n (complex) roots of t, except in t = 0, where the fiber consists of only one element, z = 0. One says that the map is "ramified" in zero. This is an example of a branched covering of Riemann surfaces. This intuition also serves to define ramification in algebraic number theory. Given a (necessarily finite) extension of number fields , a prime ideal p of  generates the ideal pOK of  This ideal may or may not be a prime ideal, but, according to the Lasker–Noether theorem (see above), always is given by
pO = q1e1 q2e2 ⋯ qmem
Whenever one ramification index is bigger than one, the prime p is said to ramify in 

The connection between this definition and the geometric situation is delivered by the map of spectra of rings  In fact, unramified morphisms of schemes in algebraic geometry are a direct generalization of unramified extensions of number fields.

Ramification is a purely local property, i.e., depends only on the completions around the primes p and qi. The inertia group measures the difference between the local Galois groups at some place and the Galois groups of the involved finite residue fields.

An example

The following example illustrates the notions introduced above. In order to compute the ramification index of  where

f(x) = x3 − x − 1 = 0,

at 23, it suffices to consider the field extension  Up to 529 = 232 (i.e., modulo 529) f can be factored as
f(x) = (x + 181)(x2 − 181x − 38) = gh.

Substituting  in the first factor g modulo 529 yields y + 191, so the valuation | y |g for y given by g is | −191 |23 = 1. On the other hand, the same substitution in h yields  Since 161 = 7 × 23,

Since possible values for the absolute value of the place defined by the factor h are not confined to integer powers of 23, but instead are integer powers of the square root of 23, the ramification index of the field extension at 23 is two.

The valuations of any element of  can be computed in this way using resultants. If, for example y = x2 − x − 1, using the resultant to eliminate x between this relationship and f = x3 − x − 1 = 0 gives . If instead we eliminate with respect to the factors g and h of f, we obtain the corresponding factors for the polynomial for y, and then the 23-adic valuation applied to the constant (norm) term allows us to compute the valuations of y for g and h (which are both 1 in this instance.)

Dedekind discriminant theorem

Much of the significance of the discriminant lies in the fact that ramified ultrametric places are all places obtained from factorizations in  where p divides the discriminant. This is even true of the polynomial discriminant; however the converse is also true, that if a prime p divides the discriminant, then there is a p-place which ramifies. For this converse the field discriminant is needed. This is the Dedekind discriminant theorem. In the example above, the discriminant of the number field  with x3 − x − 1 = 0 is −23, and as we have seen the 23-adic place ramifies. The Dedekind discriminant tells us it is the only ultrametric place which does.

Galois groups and Galois cohomology
Generally in abstract algebra, field extensions K / L can be studied by examining the Galois group Gal(K / L), consisting of field automorphisms of  leaving  elementwise fixed. As an example, the Galois group  of the cyclotomic field extension of degree n (see above) is given by (Z/nZ)×, the group of invertible elements in Z/nZ. This is the first stepstone into Iwasawa theory.

In order to include all possible extensions having certain properties, the Galois group concept is commonly applied to the (infinite) field extension  / K of the algebraic closure, leading to the absolute Galois group G := Gal(  / K) or just Gal(K), and to the extension . For example, the abelianization (the biggest abelian quotient) Gab of G corresponds to a field referred to as the maximal abelian extension Kab (called so since any further extension is not abelian, i.e., does not have an abelian Galois group). For more general number fields, class field theory, specifically the Artin reciprocity law gives an answer by describing Gab in terms of the idele class group.

In certain situations, the Galois group acts on other mathematical objects, for example a group. Such a group is then also referred to as a Galois module. This enables the use of group cohomology for the Galois group Gal(K), also known as Galois cohomology, which in the first place measures the failure of exactness of taking Gal(K)-invariants, but offers deeper insights (and questions) as well. For example, the Galois group G of a field extension L / K acts on L×, the nonzero elements of L. This Galois module plays a significant role in many arithmetic dualities, such as Poitou-Tate duality.

Local-global principle
Generally speaking, the term "local to global" refers to the idea that a global problem is first done at a local level, which tends to simplify the questions. Then, of course, the information gained in the local analysis has to be put together to get back to some global statement. For example, the notion of sheaves reifies that idea in topology and geometry.

Local and global fields
Number fields share a great deal of similarity with another class of fields much used in algebraic geometry known as function fields of algebraic curves over finite fields. An example is Kp(T). They are similar in many respects, for example in that number rings are one-dimensional regular rings, as are the coordinate rings (the quotient fields of which is the function field in question) of curves. Therefore, both types of field are called global fields. In accordance with the philosophy laid out above, they can be studied at a local level first, that is to say, by looking at the corresponding local fields. For function fields, the local fields are completions of the local rings at all points of the curve for function fields.

Many results valid for function fields also hold, at least if reformulated properly, for number fields. However, the study of number fields often poses difficulties and phenomena not encountered in function fields. For example, in function fields, there is no dichotomy into non-archimedean and archimedean places. Nonetheless, function fields often serves as a source of intuition what should be expected in the number field case.

Hasse principle

A prototypical question, posed at a global level, is whether some polynomial equation has a solution in  If this is the case, this solution is also a solution in all completions. The local-global principle or Hasse principle asserts that for quadratic equations, the converse holds, as well. This implication does not hold, however, for more general types of equations. However, the idea of passing from local data to global ones proves fruitful in class field theory, for example, where local class field theory is used to obtain global insights mentioned above.

Adeles and ideles
In order to assemble local data pertaining to all local fields attached to  the adele ring is set up. A multiplicative variant is referred to as ideles.

See also

Generalizations 

 Algebraic function field

Algebraic number theory 
Dirichlet's unit theorem, S-unit
Kummer extension
Minkowski's theorem, Geometry of numbers
Chebotarev's density theorem

Class field theory 
 Ray class group
 Decomposition group
 Genus field

Notes

References
 
 Keith Conrad, http://www.math.uconn.edu/~kconrad/blurbs/gradnumthy/unittheorem.pdf
 
 Helmut Hasse, Number Theory, Springer Classics in Mathematics Series (2002)
 Serge Lang, Algebraic Number Theory, second edition, Springer, 2000
 Richard A. Mollin, Algebraic Number Theory, CRC, 1999
 Ram Murty, Problems in Algebraic Number Theory, Second Edition, Springer, 2005
 
 

 André Weil, Basic Number Theory, third edition, Springer, 1995

Algebraic number theory
Field (mathematics)